Aspire is a political party in the London Borough of Tower Hamlets, England, formed by Lutfur Rahman and councillors elected as members of his Tower Hamlets First party. After Tower Hamlets First was removed from the register of political parties following voting fraud and malpractice, its councillors formed the Tower Hamlets Independent Group (THIG). After some defections, the remaining Tower Hamlets Independent Group councillors registered formally as a political party in 2018. Most of its elected members were former Labour Party members, with a few exceptions.

It was the largest political opposition on Tower Hamlets Council before the 2018 May elections and then gained majority control of the council in the 2022 election, winning 24 of the council's 45 seats. Rahman was also re-elected mayor in those elections.

Background
Tower Hamlets First was established by Lutfur Rahman on 18 September 2013. Formerly the Labour leader of Tower Hamlets council, Rahman had been elected as Mayor in 2010. The party stood candidates in the 2014 Tower Hamlets Council election, where it won 18 out of 45 seats, becoming the second-largest party on Tower Hamlets Council and the fifth-largest political party out of all London borough councils. The party was suspended in 23 April 2015, after an election court report that found Rahman "personally guilty of 'corrupt or illegal practices' or both" with the party labelled as a "one-man band". The party was removed from the list of political parties maintained by the Electoral Commission on 29 April 2015.

Following the dissolution of Tower Hamlets First, the majority of former party members established the Tower Hamlets Independent Group (THIG) to co-ordinate activity on the council. Six members subsequently left the Tower Hamlets Independent Group to form the competing People's Alliance group. The remaining THIG councillors then became Aspire.

Although then barred from running for elected office himself, Rahman was behind the party. Aspire was his second attempt at a new party after an application under the name 'Tower Hamlets Together' was rejected.

The ideology of the party is self-described as a form of democratic socialism. It has been criticized for only fielding candidates of Bangladeshi heritage for the 2022 Tower Hamlets local election, with only three of their candidates being female. Shortly after these elections, new allegations over voter intimidation, family voting and impersonating voters were raised by independent observers.

Initial representation
Between its formation and the May 2018 elections, Aspire councillors occupied 10 of the 45 council seats on the Tower Hamlets Council.

Ohid Ahmed was a senior Labour Party councillor as a cabinet member between 2002 and 2010. He was also the Labour Party candidate for West Suffolk in 2010, and Deputy Mayor of Tower Hamlets between 2010 and 2014. Harun Miah was formerly a Respect Party Councillor. Maium Miah was formerly a Conservative Party councillor for Millwall before joining Tower Hamlets First, and stood in Canary Wharf ward in 2014.

The party's general secretary, Lillian Collins, was formerly Labour's party chair in Tower Hamlets.

Election results

2018 Borough Council Election
Ohid Ahmed stood in the 2018 election for directly elected Mayor of Tower Hamlets, coming third behind Labour and the People's Alliance of Tower Hamlets, a group that had earlier split from the Tower Hamlets Independent Group. Ahmed was endorsed by Rahman.

On 4 April 2018, Aspire launched its campaign for the borough elections in Tower Hamlets, with a full slate of 45 council candidates. It won no seats.

By-elections 2018–2022
Aspire stood in two council by-elections in Tower Hamlets on 7 February 2019, with Harun Miah winning the one in Shadwell ward and Ohid Ahmed coming second in Lansbury ward.

On 12 August 2021, Aspire stood in the by-election to the Weavers ward via candidate Kabir Ahmed winning 47%.  He had served some years as Councillor until 2014.  That election followed the death of the Labour incumbent.

2022 Borough Council Election 
Following a five-year ban from holding public office, Lutfur Rahman was again elected as Mayor of Tower Hamlets in the May 2022 local elections, defeating Labour incumbent John Biggs. Aspire was also successful in the Borough Council election, winning a majority with 24 out of 45 seats.

References

External links
Aspire registration

2018 establishments in England
Political parties established in 2018
Locally based political parties in England
Tower Hamlets First